Defy Thirst is a 501(c)(3) non-profit organization and sub-branch of Defiant Missions Inc. that provides clean, safe drinking water to people in impoverished and developing countries.  Founded in 2009 by Matthew Ayers Turner and Stephen Dupuis, the Atlanta-based organization developed and implements unique water filtration systems that have been installed in countries including Ecuador, Ghana, Haiti, and Honduras.

References

External links
 

Charities based in Georgia (U.S. state)
Water-related charities